The 1966–67 Central Professional Hockey League season was the fourth season of the Central Professional Hockey League, a North American minor pro league. Six teams participated in the regular season, and the Oklahoma City Blazers won the league title.

Regular season

Playoffs

External links
 Statistics on hockeydb.com

CPHL
Central Professional Hockey League seasons